Arrow Creek is an unincorporated community in Judith Basin County, in the U.S. state of Montana. It is about 15 miles north of Stanford.

History
A post office was established at Arrow Creek in 1914, and closed in 1920. The community took its name from nearby Arrow Creek.

References

Unincorporated communities in Judith Basin County, Montana
Unincorporated communities in Montana
1914 establishments in Montana
Populated places established in 1914